Mar Joy Alappat (born September 27, 1956) is an Indian-born bishop of the Syro-Malabar Catholic Church in the United States. He serves as the eparch of St. Thomas Eparchy of Chicago since 2022. 

He served as the auxiliary bishop of the same eparchy from 2014–2022.

Biography

Early life and ministry 
John Joy Alappat was born in Parappukara, Kerala, India.  He studied for the priesthood at St. Thomas Apostolic Seminary in Vadavathoor, and was ordained a priest for the Syro-Malabar Catholic Eparchy of Irinjalakuda in India on December 31, 1981, by Bishop James Pazhayattil.  Alappat continued his studies at St. Joseph's Pontifical Institute in Aluva an at the Adheva University in Wattair.  He was then engaged in pastoral work in Chalkudy, Mala, the cathedral in Irinjalakuda, and as a chaplain in Chennai.  In 1993 he was transferred to the United States where he served as a chaplain at the Georgetown University Medical Center where he also completed his clinical pastoral education program.  Alappat also served in pastoral assignments in New Milford, Newark and Garfield, New Jersey and as the vicar at the Mar Thoma Shleeha Cathedral in Bellwood, Illinois.

Auxiliary Bishop 
Pope Francis named Alappat as the titular bishop of Bencenna and the Auxiliary Bishop of the St. Thomas Syro-Malabar Catholic Eparchy of Chicago on July 24, 2014.  He was ordained a bishop by George Alencherry, the major archbishop of Ernakulam-Angamaly, on September 27, 2014. The principal co-consecrators were Jacob Angadiath of Chicago and Pauly Kannookadan of Irinjalakuda.

Eparch 
On July 3, 2022, Pope Francis accepted Bishop Jacob Angadiath's resignation, and named Alappat as successor. 

Alappat was installed at the Mar Thoma Sleeha Syro-Malabar Catholic Cathedral in Bellwood, Illinois by head of the Syro-Malabar Church George Alencherry, Jacob Angadiath, and Stephen Chirappanath in the presence of Christophe Pierre, apostolic nuncio to the United States.

See also
 

 Catholic Church hierarchy
 Catholic Church in the United States
 Historical list of the Catholic bishops of the United States
 List of Catholic bishops of the United States
 Lists of patriarchs, archbishops, and bishops

References

External links
Syro-Malabar Catholic Eparchy of St. Thomas of Chicago Official Site

Episcopal succession

1956 births
Living people
People from Thrissur district
Indian emigrants to the United States
Syro-Malabar bishops
Indian-American Syro-Malabar Catholic bishops
21st-century Eastern Catholic bishops
American people of Malayali descent
Bishops appointed by Pope Francis
Eastern Catholic bishops in the United States